Marieke Koekkoek (born 26 February 1989) is a Dutch lawyer and politician for the pro-European party Volt Netherlands. She was elected to the House of Representatives in the 2021 general election owing to the number of preference votes she received. Prior to being a member of parliament, she studied law and worked as a legal intern.

Early life and career 
Koekkoek was born in the Dutch capital of Amsterdam and grew up in its neighbourhood Zuidoost. Her parents were elementary school teachers. After having spent a gap year in Australia and Europe, she started studying Dutch law at Utrecht University in 2008. She was a member of its study association Urios and chaired Urios's Model United Nations Society. After her graduation in 2011, Koekkoek studied a year at the University of Amsterdam and another year at the University of Barcelona, obtaining master's degrees in International Trade and Investment Law and in International Economic Law and Policy, respectively.

In October 2013, Koekkoek joined the KU Leuven's Centre for Global Governance Studies as a PhD student and researcher. She specialized in international commercial law and returned to the Netherlands in 2017, while she kept working at KU Leuven. Koekkoek lived in China for some time in 2019 to teach at the China-EU School of Law. She became a legal intern for Fieldfisher in Amsterdam in September 2019.

Politics 
Koekkoek joined the new pro-European party Volt in 2018 after she had been a member of Democrats 66. She was involved in creating the party's European platform and participated in the 2019 European Parliament election in the Netherlands as Volt's 22nd candidate.

She was placed fourth on the party list in the 2021 general election and again helped write the platform. Koekkoek campaigned on LGBT rights and on immigration. She wanted the procedure for asylum seekers to become quicker, and she wanted them to have the right to work and to learn the Dutch language while awaiting the results of their asylum application. Even though Volt won three seats in the election, Koekkoek was elected to the House of Representatives because of her 37,093 preference votes at the expense of Volt's third candidate, Ernst Boutkan. Koekkoek was one of three candidates in the 2021 election who were elected due to their preference votes. In late 2022, the House of Representatives passed a motion by Koekkoek and Hülya Kat (D66) to have the government provide free period products to low-income households. Koekkoek called it a start and advocating making them free for everyone.

In the House, she is on the following committees:
 Committee for Agriculture, Nature and Food Quality
 Committee for Foreign Trade and Development Cooperation
 Committee for Health, Welfare and Sport
 Committee for Justice and Security
 Committee for Kingdom Relations
 Petitions committee
 Committee for Social Affairs and Employment

Personal life 
Koekkoek lives in the Utrecht neighbourhood of Leidsche Rijn. She has a husband from China, who came to the Netherlands to study and work, and she has two children. Koekkoek can play violin.

References 

1989 births
Living people
21st-century Dutch lawyers
21st-century Dutch politicians
21st-century Dutch women politicians
21st-century women lawyers
Dutch women lawyers
Members of the House of Representatives (Netherlands)
Politicians from Amsterdam
Utrecht University alumni
Volt Europa politicians
Lawyers from Amsterdam
LGBT members of the Parliament of the Netherlands
Dutch bisexual people
Bisexual politicians
Politicians from Utrecht (city)
KU Leuven alumni
University of Amsterdam alumni
University of Barcelona alumni
21st-century Dutch LGBT people